Jean-Jacques Razanajafy (born 30 March 1988) is a retired Malagasy football midfielder.

References

1988 births
Living people
Malagasy footballers
Madagascar international footballers
Ajesaia players
Association football midfielders
People from Antananarivo